Henry Peter Christian Hansen (16 March 1902 – 28 March 1985) was a Danish road racing cyclist who won two gold medals at the 1928 Summer Olympics and a silver medal at the 1932 Summer Olympics. Hansen won the world title in 1931 and placed in the top 10 at three other world championships. At the Nordic Championships, he won the individual road race in 1925–1927 and 1929, and held the team title in 1926 and 1929. Nationally, he won the Danish championships in 1921, 1923, 1925, and 1930. In 1937 and 1938 he competed professionally without major success. After retiring from competitions he held various administrative positions, serving as Chairman of the Danish Cycling Union in 1967–1971.

Hansen's niece was married to Knud Enemark Jensen, the Danish cyclist who died during competition at the 1960 Summer Olympics.

References

1902 births
1985 deaths
Danish male cyclists
Olympic gold medalists for Denmark
Olympic silver medalists for Denmark
Olympic cyclists of Denmark
Cyclists at the 1928 Summer Olympics
Cyclists at the 1932 Summer Olympics
Olympic medalists in cycling
Cyclists from Copenhagen
Medalists at the 1928 Summer Olympics
Medalists at the 1932 Summer Olympics